Standard Oil Company, Inc., was an American oil production, transportation, refining, and marketing company that operated from 1870 to 1911. At its height, Standard Oil was the largest petroleum company in the world, and its success made its co-founder and chairman, John D. Rockefeller, among the wealthiest Americans of all time and among the richest people in modern history. Its history as one of the world's first and largest multinational corporations ended in 1911, when the U.S. Supreme Court ruled that it was an illegal monopoly.

The company was founded in 1863 by Rockefeller and Henry Flagler, and was incorporated in 1870. Standard Oil dominated the oil products market initially through horizontal integration in the refining sector, then, in later years vertical integration; the company was an innovator in the development of the business trust. The Standard Oil trust streamlined production and logistics, lowered costs, and undercut competitors. "Trust-busting" critics accused it of using aggressive pricing to destroy competitors and form a monopoly that threatened other businesses.

Rockefeller ran the company as its chairman, until his retirement in 1897.  He remained the major shareholder, and in 1911, with the dissolution of the trust into 43 smaller companies, Rockefeller became the richest person in modern history, as the initial income of these individual enterprises proved to be much bigger than that of a single larger company. Standard Oil of New Jersey, the entity controlling Standard Oil at the time of the breakup, has since continued on and today is known as ExxonMobil, the largest investor-owned oil company in the world. Many other companies across multiple sectors are either direct descendants of Standard Oil (such as Chevron and Marathon Oil) or have acquired a Standard Oil descendant (such as BP and Unilever).

Founding and early years

Standard Oil's pre-history began in 1863, as an Ohio partnership formed by industrialist John D. Rockefeller, his brother William Rockefeller, Henry Flagler, chemist Samuel Andrews, silent partner Stephen V. Harkness, and Oliver Burr Jennings, who had married the sister of William Rockefeller's wife. In 1870, Rockefeller abolished the partnership and incorporated Standard Oil in Ohio. Of the initial 10,000 shares, John D. Rockefeller received 2,667, Harkness received 1,334, William Rockefeller, Flagler, and Andrews received 1,333 each, Jennings received 1,000, and the firm of Rockefeller, Andrews & Flagler received 1,000. Rockefeller chose the "Standard Oil" name as a symbol of the reliable "standards" of quality and service that he envisioned for the nascent oil industry.

In the early years, John D. Rockefeller dominated the combine; he was the single most important figure in shaping the new oil industry. He quickly distributed power and the tasks of policy formation to a system of committees, but always remained the largest shareholder. Authority was centralized in the company's main office in Cleveland, but decisions in the office were made cooperatively.

The company grew by increasing sales and through acquisitions. After purchasing competing firms, Rockefeller shut down those he believed to be inefficient and kept the others. In a seminal deal, in 1868, the Lake Shore Railroad, a part of the New York Central, gave Rockefeller's firm a going rate of one cent a gallon or forty-two cents a barrel, an effective 71% discount from its listed rates in return for a promise to ship at least 60 carloads of oil daily and to handle loading and unloading on its own. Smaller companies decried such deals as unfair because they were not producing enough oil to qualify for discounts.

Standard's actions and secret transport deals helped its kerosene price to drop from 58 to 26 cents from 1865 to 1870. Rockefeller used the Erie Canal as a cheap alternative form of transportation—in the summer months when it was not frozen—to ship his refined oil from Cleveland to New York City. In the winter months, his only options were the three trunk lines—the Erie Railroad and the New York Central Railroad to New York City, and the Pennsylvania Railroad to Pittsburgh and Philadelphia. 

Competitors disliked the company's business practices, but consumers liked the lower prices. Standard Oil, being formed well before the discovery of the Spindletop oil field (in Texas, far from Standard Oil's base in the Midwest) and a demand for oil other than for heat and light, was well placed to control the growth of the oil business. The company was perceived to own and control all aspects of the trade.

South Improvement Company
In 1872, Rockefeller joined the South Improvement Co. which would have allowed him to receive rebates for shipping and drawbacks on oil his competitors shipped. But when this deal became known, competitors convinced the Pennsylvania Legislature to revoke South Improvement's charter. No oil was ever shipped under this arrangement. Using highly effective tactics, later widely criticized, it absorbed or destroyed most of its competition in Cleveland in less than two months and later throughout the northeastern United States.

Hepburn Committee
A. Barton Hepburn was directed by the New York State Legislature in 1879, to investigate the railroads' practice of giving rebates to their largest clients within the state. Merchants without ties to the oil industry had pressed for the hearings. Prior to the committee's investigation, few knew of the size of Standard Oil's control and influence on seemingly unaffiliated oil refineries and pipelines—Hawke (1980) cites that only a dozen or so within Standard Oil knew the extent of company operations.

The committee counsel, Simon Sterne, questioned representatives from the Erie Railroad and the New York Central Railroad and discovered that at least half of their long-haul traffic granted rebates and much of this traffic came from Standard Oil. The committee then shifted focus to Standard Oil's operations. John Dustin Archbold, as president of Acme Oil Company, denied that Acme was associated with Standard Oil. He then admitted to being a director of Standard Oil.

The committee's final report scolded the railroads for their rebate policies and cited Standard Oil as an example. This scolding was largely moot to Standard Oil's interests since long-distance oil pipelines were now their preferred method of transportation.

Standard Oil Trust
In response to state laws that had the result of limiting the scale of companies, Rockefeller and his associates developed innovative ways of organizing to effectively manage their fast-growing enterprise. On January 2, 1882, they combined their disparate companies, spread across dozens of states, under a single group of trustees. By a secret agreement, the existing 37 stockholders conveyed their shares "in trust" to nine trustees: John and William Rockefeller, Oliver H. Payne, Charles Pratt, Henry Flagler, John D. Archbold, William G. Warden, Jabez Bostwick, and Benjamin Brewster. 

“Whereas some state legislatures imposed special taxes on out-of-state corporations doing business in their states, other legislatures forbade corporations in their state from holding the stock of companies based elsewhere. (Legislators established such restrictions in the hope that they would force successful companies to incorporate—and thus pay taxes—in their state.)”

Standard Oil's organizational concept proved so successful that other giant enterprises adopted this "trust" form.

By 1882, Rockefeller's top aide was John Dustin Archbold, whom he left in control after disengaging from business to concentrate on philanthropy after 1896. Other notable principals of the company include Henry Flagler, developer of the Florida East Coast Railway and resort cities, and Henry H. Rogers, who built the Virginian Railway.

In 1885, Standard Oil of Ohio moved its headquarters from Cleveland  to its permanent headquarters at 26 Broadway in New York City. Concurrently, the trustees of Standard Oil of Ohio chartered the Standard Oil Co. of New Jersey (SOCNJ) to take advantage of New Jersey's more lenient corporate stock ownership laws.

Sherman Antitrust Act of 1890
In 1890, Congress overwhelmingly passed the Sherman Antitrust Act (Senate 51–1; House 242–0), a source of American anti-monopoly laws. The law forbade every contract, scheme, deal, or conspiracy to restrain trade, though the phrase "restraint of trade" remained subjective. The Standard Oil group quickly attracted attention from antitrust authorities leading to a lawsuit filed by Ohio Attorney General David K. Watson.

Earnings and dividends
From 1882 to 1906, Standard paid out $548,436,000 in dividends at a 65.4% payout ratio. The total net earnings from 1882 to 1906 amounted to $838,783,800, exceeding the dividends by $290,347,800, which was used for plant expansions.

1895–1913

In 1896, John Rockefeller retired from the Standard Oil Co. of New Jersey, the holding company of the group, but remained president and a major shareholder. Vice-president John Dustin Archbold took a large part in the running of the firm. In the year 1904, Standard Oil controlled 91% of oil refinement and 85% of final sales in the United States. At this time, state and federal laws sought to counter this development with antitrust laws. In 1911, the U.S. Justice Department sued the group under the federal antitrust law and ordered its breakup into 43 companies.

Standard Oil's market position was initially established through an emphasis on efficiency and responsibility. While most companies dumped gasoline in rivers (this was before the automobile was popular), Standard used it to fuel its machines. While other companies' refineries piled mountains of heavy waste, Rockefeller found ways to sell it. For example, Standard created the first synthetic competitor for beeswax (Paraffin) and bought the company that invented and produced Vaseline, the Chesebrough Manufacturing Co., which was a Standard company only from 1908 until 1911.

One of the original "Muckrakers" Ida M. Tarbell, was an American author and journalist whose father was an oil producer whose business had failed because of Rockefeller's business dealings. After extensive interviews with a sympathetic senior executive of Standard Oil, Henry H. Rogers, Tarbell's investigations of Standard Oil fueled growing public attacks on Standard Oil and monopolies in general. Her work was published in 19 parts in McClure's magazine from November 1902 to October 1904, then in 1904 as the book The History of the Standard Oil Co.

The Standard Oil Trust was controlled by a small group of families. Rockefeller stated in 1910: "I think it is true that the Pratt family, the Payne–Whitney family (which were one, as all the stock came from Colonel Payne), the Harkness-Flagler family (which came into the company together) and the Rockefeller family controlled a majority of the stock during all the history of the company up to the present time."

These families reinvested most of the dividends in other industries, especially railroads. They also invested heavily in the gas and the electric lighting business (including the giant Consolidated Gas Co. of New York City). They made large purchases of stock in U.S. Steel, Amalgamated Copper, and even Corn Products Refining Co.

Weetman Pearson, a British petroleum entrepreneur in Mexico, began negotiating with Standard Oil in 1912–13 to sell his "El Aguila" oil company, since Pearson was no longer bound to promises to the Porfirio Díaz regime (1876–1911) to not to sell to U.S. interests. However, the deal fell through and the firm was sold to Royal Dutch Shell.

In China
Standard Oil's production increased so rapidly it soon exceeded U.S. demand and the company began viewing export markets. In the 1890s, Standard Oil began marketing kerosene to China's large population of close to 400 million as lamp fuel. For its Chinese trademark and brand, Standard Oil adopted the name Mei Foo, (which translates to Mobil). Mei Foo also became the name of the tin lamp that Standard Oil produced and gave away or sold cheaply to Chinese farmers, encouraging them to switch from vegetable oil to kerosene. The response was positive, sales boomed and China became Standard Oil's largest market in Asia. Prior to Pearl Harbor, Stanvac was the largest single U.S. investment in Southeast Asia.

The North China Department of Socony (Standard Oil Company of New York) operated a subsidiary called Socony River and Coastal Fleet, North Coast Division, which became the North China Division of Stanvac (Standard Vacuum Oil Company) after that company was formed in 1933. To distribute its products, Standard Oil constructed storage tanks, canneries (bulk oil from large ocean tankers was re-packaged into  tins), warehouses, and offices in key Chinese cities. For inland distribution, the company had motor tank trucks and railway tank cars, and for river navigation, it had a fleet of low-draft steamers and other vessels.

Stanvac's North China Division, based in Shanghai, owned hundreds of river-going vessels, including motor barges, steamers, launches, tugboats, and tankers. Up to 13 tankers operated on the Yangtze River, the largest of which were Mei Ping, Mei Hsia, and Mei An. All three were destroyed in the 1937 USS Panay incident. 

Mei An was launched in 1901 and was the first vessel in the fleet. Other vessels included Mei Chuen, Mei Foo, Mei Hung, Mei Kiang, Mei Lu, Mei Tan, Mei Su, Mei Xia, Mei Ying, and Mei Yun. Mei Hsia, a tanker, was specially designed for river duty. It was built by New Engineering and Shipbuilding Works of Shanghai, who also built the 500-ton launch Mei Foo in 1912.

Mei Hsia ("Beautiful Gorges") was launched in 1926 and carried 350 tons of bulk oil in three holds, plus a forward cargo hold, and space between decks for carrying general cargo or packed oil. Mei Ping ("Beautiful Tranquility"), launched in 1927, was designed off-shore, but assembled and finished in Shanghai. Its oil-fuel burners came from the U.S. and water-tube boilers came from England.

In the Middle East
Standard Oil Company and Socony-Vacuum Oil Company became partners in providing markets for the oil reserves in the Middle East. In 1906, SOCONY (later Mobil) opened its first fuel terminals in Alexandria. It explored in Palestine before the World War broke out, but ran into conflict with the local authorities.

Monopoly charges and antitrust legislation

By 1890, Standard Oil controlled 88 percent of the refined oil flows in the United States. The state of Ohio successfully sued Standard, compelling the dissolution of the trust in 1892. But Standard simply separated Standard Oil of Ohio and kept control of it. Eventually, the state of New Jersey changed its incorporation laws to allow a company to hold shares in other companies in any state.

So, in 1899, the Standard Oil Trust, based at 26 Broadway in New York, was legally reborn as a holding company, the Standard Oil Co. of New Jersey (SOCNJ), which held stock in 41 other companies, which controlled other companies, which in turn controlled yet other companies. According to Daniel Yergin in his Pulitzer Prize-winning The Prize: The Epic Quest for Oil, Money, and Power (1990), this conglomerate was seen by the public as all-pervasive, controlled by a select group of directors, and completely unaccountable.

In 1904, Standard controlled 91 percent of production and 85 percent of final sales. Most of its output was kerosene, of which 55 percent was exported around the world. After 1900 it did not try to force competitors out of business by selling at a loss. The federal Commissioner of Corporations studied Standard's operations from the period of 1904 to 1906 and concluded that "beyond question ... the dominant position of the Standard Oil Co. in the refining industry was due to unfair practices—to abuse of the control of pipe-lines, to railroad discriminations, and to unfair methods of competition in the sale of the refined petroleum products". 

Because of competition from other firms, their market share gradually eroded to 70 percent by 1906 which was the year when the antitrust case was filed against Standard. Standard's market share was 64 percent by 1911 when Standard was ordered broken up. At least 147 refining companies were competing with Standard including Gulf, Texaco, and Shell. It did not try to monopolize the exploration and extraction of oil (its share in 1911 was 11 percent).

In 1909, the U.S. Justice Department sued Standard under federal antitrust law, the Sherman Antitrust Act of 1890, for sustaining a monopoly and restraining interstate commerce by:

Rebates, preferences, and other discriminatory practices in favor of the combination by railroad companies; restraint and monopolization by control of pipe lines, and unfair practices against competing pipe lines; contracts with competitors in restraint of trade; unfair methods of competition, such as local price cutting at the points where necessary to suppress competition; [and] espionage of the business of competitors, the operation of bogus independent companies, and payment of rebates on oil, with the like intent.

The lawsuit argued that Standard's monopolistic practices had taken place over the preceding four years:

The general result of the investigation has been to disclose the existence of numerous and flagrant discriminations by the railroads in behalf of the Standard Oil Co. and its affiliated corporations. With comparatively few exceptions, mainly of other large concerns in California, the Standard has been the sole beneficiary of such discriminations. In almost every section of the country that company has been found to enjoy some unfair advantages over its competitors, and some of these discriminations affect enormous areas.

The government identified four illegal patterns: (1) secret and semi-secret railroad rates; (2) discriminations in the open arrangement of rates; (3) discriminations in classification and rules of shipment; (4) discriminations in the treatment of private tank cars. The government alleged:

Almost everywhere the rates from the shipping points used exclusively, or almost exclusively, by the Standard are relatively lower than the rates from the shipping points of its competitors. Rates have been made low to let the Standard into markets, or they have been made high to keep its competitors out of markets. Trifling differences in distances are made an excuse for large differences in rates favorable to the Standard Oil Co., while large differences in distances are ignored where they are against the Standard. Sometimes connecting roads prorate on oil—that is, make through rates which are lower than the combination of local rates; sometimes they refuse to prorate; but in either case the result of their policy is to favor the Standard Oil Co. Different methods are used in different places and under different conditions, but the net result is that from Maine to California the general arrangement of open rates on petroleum oil is such as to give the Standard an unreasonable advantage over its competitors.

The government said that Standard raised prices to its monopolistic customers but lowered them to hurt competitors, often disguising its illegal actions by using bogus supposedly independent companies it controlled.

The evidence is, in fact, absolutely conclusive that the Standard Oil Co. charges altogether excessive prices where it meets no competition, and particularly where there is little likelihood of competitors entering the field, and that, on the other hand, where competition is active, it frequently cuts prices to a point which leaves even the Standard little or no profit, and which more often leaves no profit to the competitor, whose costs are ordinarily somewhat higher.

On May 15, 1911, the US Supreme Court upheld the lower court judgment and declared the Standard Oil group to be an "unreasonable" monopoly under the Sherman Antitrust Act, Section II. It ordered Standard to break up into 43 independent companies with different boards of directors, the biggest two of the companies were Standard Oil of New Jersey (which became Exxon) and Standard Oil of New York (which became Mobil).

Standard's president, John D. Rockefeller, had long since retired from any management role. But, as he owned a quarter of the shares of the resultant companies, and those share values mostly doubled, he emerged from the dissolution as the richest man in the world. The dissolution had actually propelled Rockefeller's personal wealth.

Breakup

By 1911 the Supreme Court of the United States ruled, in Standard Oil Co. of New Jersey v. United States, that Standard Oil of New Jersey must be dissolved under the Sherman Antitrust Act and split into 43 companies.  Two of these companies were Standard Oil of New Jersey (Jersey Standard or Esso), which eventually became Exxon, and Standard Oil of New York (Socony), which eventually became Mobil; those two companies later merged into ExxonMobil.

Over the next few decades, both companies grew significantly. Jersey Standard, led by Walter C. Teagle, became the largest oil producer in the world. It acquired a 50 percent share in Humble Oil & Refining Co., a Texas oil producer. Socony purchased a 45 percent interest in Magnolia Petroleum Co., a major refiner, marketer, and pipeline transporter. In 1931, Socony merged with Vacuum Oil Co., an industry pioneer dating back to 1866, and a growing Standard Oil spin-off in its own right.

In the Asia-Pacific region, Jersey Standard had oil production and refineries in the Dutch East Indies but no marketing network. Socony-Vacuum had Asian marketing outlets supplied remotely from California. In 1933, Jersey Standard and Socony-Vacuum merged their interests in the region into a 50–50 joint venture. Standard-Vacuum Oil Co., or "Stanvac", operated in 50 countries, from East Africa to New Zealand, before it was dissolved in 1962.

Rockefeller's original company, Standard Oil Company of Ohio (Sohio), effectively ceased to exist when it was purchased by BP in 1987. BP continued to sell gasoline under the Sohio brand until 1991. Other Standard oil entities include "Standard Oil of Indiana" which became Amoco after other mergers and a name change in the 1980s, and "Standard Oil of California" which became the Chevron Corp.

Legacy and criticism of breakup

Some have speculated that if not for that court ruling, Standard Oil could have possibly been worth more than $1 trillion in the 2000s. Whether the breakup of Standard Oil was beneficial is a matter of some controversy. Some economists believe that Standard Oil was not a monopoly, and argue that the intense free market competition resulted in cheaper oil prices and more diverse petroleum products. Critics claimed that success in meeting consumer needs was driving other companies, who were not as successful, out of the market.

An example of this thinking was given in 1890, when Rep. William Mason, arguing in favor of the Sherman Antitrust Act, said: "trusts have made products cheaper, have reduced prices; but if the price of oil, for instance, were reduced to one cent a barrel, it would not right the wrong done to people of this country by the trusts which have destroyed legitimate competition and driven honest men from legitimate business enterprise".

The Sherman Antitrust Act prohibits the restraint of trade. Defenders of Standard Oil insist that the company did not restrain trade; they were simply superior competitors. The federal courts ruled otherwise.

Some economic historians have observed that Standard Oil was in the process of losing its monopoly at the time of its breakup in 1911. Although Standard had 90 percent of American refining capacity in 1880, by 1911, that had shrunk to between 60 and 65 percent because of the expansion in capacity by competitors. Numerous regional competitors (such as Pure Oil in the East, Texaco and Gulf Oil in the Gulf Coast, Cities Service and Sun in the Midcontinent, Union in California, and Shell overseas) had organized themselves into competitive vertically integrated oil companies, the industry structure pioneered years earlier by Standard itself.

In addition, demand for petroleum products was increasing more rapidly than the ability of Standard to expand. The result was that although in 1911 Standard still controlled most production in the older regions of the Appalachian Basin (78 percent share, down from 92 percent in 1880), Lima-Indiana (90 percent, down from 95 percent in 1906), and the Illinois Basin (83 percent, down from 100 percent in 1906), its share was much lower in the rapidly expanding new regions that would dominate U.S. oil production in the 20th century. In 1911, Standard controlled only 44 percent of production in the Midcontinent, 29 percent in California, and 10 percent on the Gulf Coast.

Some analysts argue that the breakup was beneficial to consumers in the long run, and no one has ever proposed that Standard Oil be reassembled in pre-1911 form. ExxonMobil, however, does represent a substantial part of the original company.

Since the breakup of Standard Oil, several companies, such as General Motors and Microsoft, have come under antitrust investigation for being inherently too large for market competition; however, most of them remained together. The only company since the breakup of Standard Oil that was divided into parts like Standard Oil was AT&T, which after decades as a regulated natural monopoly, was forced to divest itself of the Bell System in 1984.

Successor companies

Standard Oil's breakup split the company into 43 separate companies. Several of these companies were considered among the Seven Sisters who dominated the industry worldwide for much of the 20th century, and both Standard Oil's direct and indirect descendants make up Big Oil. 

Today, Standard Oil's influence is primarily concentrated in a few companies:

 ExxonMobil, continuation of Standard Oil of New Jersey (later Exxon) which merged with Standard Oil of New York (later Mobil)
 Chevron, continuation of Standard Oil of California which acquired Kentucky Standard
 BP, continuation of the Anglo-Persian Oil Company which acquired Standard Oil of Ohio and Standard Oil of Indiana
 Marathon Oil and Marathon Petroleum, continuations of The Ohio Oil Company
 ConocoPhillips and Phillips 66, continuations of the Continental Oil Company

Many of today's largest oil and gas companies are or have acquired a descendant of Standard Oil. Moreover, many other companies have acquired or been created from Standard Oil descendants over time, including Unilever (which acquired Standard descendant Vaseline in 1987), TransUnion (created originally as a holding company for Standard descendant Union Tank Car) and Berkshire Hathaway (which later acquired Union Tank Car).

Rights to the name

Of the 43 "Baby Standards", 11 were given rights to the Standard Oil name, based on the state they were in. Conoco and Atlantic elected to use their respective names instead of the Standard name, and their rights would be claimed by other companies.

By the 1980s, most companies were using their brand names instead of the Standard name, with Amoco being the last one to have widespread use of the "Standard" name, as it gave Midwestern owners the option of using the Amoco name or Standard.

Three supermajor companies now own the rights to the Standard name in the United States: ExxonMobil, Chevron Corp., and BP. BP acquired its rights through acquiring Standard Oil of Ohio and merging with Amoco and has a small handful of stations in the Midwestern United States using the Standard name. Likewise, BP continues to sell marine fuel under the Sohio brand at various marinas throughout Ohio. ExxonMobil keeps the Esso trademark alive at stations that sell diesel fuel by selling "Esso Diesel" displayed on the pumps. 

ExxonMobil has full international rights to the Standard name, and continues to use the Esso name overseas and in Canada.  To protect its trademark, Chevron has one station in each state it owns the rights to be branded as Standard. Some of its Standard-branded stations have a mix of some signs that say Standard and some signs that say Chevron. Over time, Chevron has changed which station in a given state is the Standard station.

In February 2016, ExxonMobil successfully asked a U.S. federal court to lift the 1930s, trademark injunction that banned it from using the Esso brand in some states. Neither BP nor Chevron objected to the decision. ExxonMobil asked for it to be lifted primarily so it could have universal marketing material for its stations globally and, likewise, the Esso name returned to some minor station signage at both Exxon and Mobil stations.

As of 2021, six states that have the Standard Oil name rights are  not being actively used by the companies that own them. Chevron withdrew from Kentucky (home of the Standard Oil of Kentucky, which Chevron acquired in 1961) in 2010, while BP gradually withdrew from five Great Plains and Rocky Mountain states (Colorado, Montana, North Dakota, Oklahoma, and Wyoming) since the initial conversion of Amoco sites to BP. As ExxonMobil has stations in all of these states, with the aforementioned minor signage ExxonMobil has de facto claimed the Standard trademark in these states, though they are still held by their respective rights holders.

See also
 History of the United States (1865–1918)
 Standard Oil Gasoline Station (disambiguation)
 Wamsutta Oil Refinery

Notes

References

Citations

General bibliography

External links

 The Dismantling of The Standard Oil Trust
 The History of the Standard Oil Co. by Ida Tarbell
 Educate Yourself: Standard Oil—Part I
 Witch-hunting for Robber Barons: The Standard Oil Story by Lawrence W. Reed—argues Standard Oil was not a coercive monopoly.
 The Truth About the "Robber Barons"—arguing that Standard Oil was not a monopoly.
 Dynastic America and Those Who Own It, 2003 [1921], by Henry H. Klein
 Standard Oil Trust original Stock Certificate signed by John. D. Rockefeller, William Rockefeller, Henry M. Flagler and Jabez Abel Bostwick - 1882  CHARLES A. WHITESHOT: THE OIL-WELL DRILLER. A HISTORY OF THE WORLD'S GREATEST ENTERPRISE, THE OIL INDUSTRY. Publisher: MANNINGTON, 1905
 The Standard Oil (New Jersey) Collection—A digital collection of photographs from the documentary project directed by Roy E. Stryker.

 
1870 establishments in Ohio
1911 disestablishments in New York (state)
American companies disestablished in 1911
American companies established in 1870
Companies based in Cleveland
Companies based in New York City
Defunct companies based in Ohio
Defunct oil companies of the United States
Former monopolies
History of the petroleum industry in the United States
Non-renewable resource companies disestablished in 1911
Non-renewable resource companies established in 1870
Progressive Era in the United States
Rockefeller family